IAFC may refer to:

 International Association of Fire Chiefs
 International Australian Football Council